Houjia is a town in Wendeng, Weihai, in eastern Shandong province, China.

References

Township-level divisions of Shandong